Amersham and Chiltern RFC are an English rugby union team located in Amersham, Buckinghamshire, England.  Founded as Chiltern RFC in 1924, the club would be renamed as Amersham and Chiltern RFC in 1992.  They are a member club of the Buckinghamshire Rugby Football Union.

For the 2020-21 season the 1XV will play in London 1 North (RFU Level 6), the 2XV will play in Bucks Berks Oxon 1 & the 3XV will play in Herts Middlesex  Merit Table 3. The club colours are claret and white.

Club history
Chiltern Rugby Club was formed on 20 December 1924 when a meeting was called to the house of Eric Redfern, "By The Way", Clifton Road, Chesham Bois.  It was to serve the expanding unities of Amersham and Chesham.  The first game was played against Berkhamsted School Old Boys XV on Boxing Day, 26 December 1924.  The first home grounds were a site behind the Pineapple Public House in White Lion Road, Amersham Common together with a field in Cokes Lane until the Copperkins Lane ground was leased from the Shardeloes estate in 1929.  The ground, with two pitches and a new pavilion was formally opened at the start the 1929–30 season with a game against West Herts F.C.  The 1st XV has seen success recently by being promoted for successive seasons and reaching the National Leagues.  Success at age group rugby has also been seen with the u17's winning the National Plate in the 2013–14 season.  World Cup winner Josh Lewsey played club Rugby at Amersham and Chiltern from a young age. Most recently Amersham & Chiltern have seen success across the board. In the 2011–12 season the club won silverware from U13 to senior level.

1st XV League History

Club Honours
1st Team:
Bucks/Oxon 1 champions (2): 1988–89, 1993–94
Southern Counties champions: 1995–96
Southern Counties (north v south) promotion playoff winners (2): 2003–04, 2009–10
South West Division 1 East champions: 2010–11
London 1 North champions: 2015–16

2nd Team:
Berks/Bucks & Oxon 1 champions: 2013-14

3rd Team:
Berks/Bucks & Oxon 2 North champions: 2008–09
Berks/Bucks & Oxon 1 North champions: 2009–10
Berks/Bucks & Oxon 3 North champions: 2012–13
Berks/Bucks & Oxon 2 champions: 2013-14

Notable former players

References

External links 
 

English rugby union teams
Rugby clubs established in 1924
Rugby union in Buckinghamshire
Amersham
Chesham